The 1978 Lambeth London Borough Council election to the Lambeth London Borough Council was held in May 1978.  The whole council was up for election. Turnout was 33.4%.

Election result

|}

Ward results

References

1978
1978 London Borough council elections
20th century in the London Borough of Lambeth